The 2022 Men's Junior Pan-American Volleyball Cup was the fifth edition of the bi-annual NORCECA Men U21 Pan-American Cup. Eight teams participated in this edition held in Havana, Cuba. This tournament served as qualifier to 2023 FIVB Volleyball Men's U21 World Championship.

Players must born on January 1, 2003, and after.

USA beat Mexico in 3 set, winning the first title of the tournament. Both teams  were qualified to 2023 U21 World Championship.

Competing nations

Qualification to 2023 FIVB Men U21 World Championship
There are 2 vacancies will be granted to this tournament. One will be granted to the top place team in the final ranking from NORCECA. Another one will be granted to the top team which not qualified to 2023 FIVB Men U21 World Championship regardless of their Confederation (NORCECA or CSV).

Competition format
 Eight teams will be divided into two pools. In the group stage each pool will play round robin.
 The first rank teams of each pool after group stage will receive byes into the semifinals.
 The second and third rank teams in each pool will play in the quarterfinals.

Competition venue

Pool standing procedure
 Number of matches won
 Match points
 Sets ratio
 Points ratio
 If the tie continues as per the point ratio between two teams, the priority will be given to the team which won the match between them. When the tie in points ratio is between three or more teams, a new classification of these teams in the terms of points 1, 2, 3 and 4 will be made taking into consideration only the matches in which they were opposed to each other.

Match won 3-0 = 5 points
Match won 3-1 = 4 points
Match won 3-2 = 3 points
Match lost 0-3 = 0 point
Match lost 1-3 = 1 points
Match lost 2-3 = 2 points
Match forfeited = 0 points (0-25, 0-25, 0-25)

Preliminary round
All times are in Cuba local Time

Group A

Reschedule due to Hurricane Ian

Group B

Final round

Championship bracket

Quarterfinals 
 Semifinals 

 3rd place match 

 Final 

 Classification 5/8 

 7th place match 

 5th place match

Final standing

Individual awards

Most Valuable Player

Best Scorer

Best Setter

Best Opposite

Best Outside Hitters

Best Middle Blockers

Best Libero

Best Server

Best Receiver

Best Digger

References

External links
Roster

Pan-American
Pan-American Volleyball Cup
International volleyball competitions hosted by Cuba
Sports competitions in Havana
Pan-American Volleyball Cup